Tom Wisdom (born 18 February 1973) is an English actor of theatre, film, and television. His performing roles include Astinos in the film 300 and the Archangel Michael in the television series Dominion.

Career
On television, Wisdom played Tom Ferguson in the long-running soap Coronation Street (1999–2000), Ivor Claire in the Evelyn Waugh adaptation Sword of Honour (2001), Stephen Clarke in the thriller Suspicion (2003) and Marco Bailey in Sky One's airline drama Mile High (2003–04). Other television work includes Harry Enfield's Brand Spanking New Show, Children of the New Forest, Wycliffe and Blackhearts in Battersea. In early 2010, Wisdom starred in an episode of Agatha Christie's Poirot. He had a one-episode guest role in NBC's Hannibal as Antony Dimmond in 2015. Wisdom also starred as the archangel Michael in SyFy Channel's Dominion, which began airing in June 2014 and was renewed for a second (and final) season which concluded on 1 October 2015.

Wisdom's notable known roles in theatre include Journey's End (UK tour, 2005) as Stanhope and Guy Bennett in Julian Mitchell's Another Country (Arts Theatre, 2000). Wisdom created and subsequently played the role of Steven Carter in Patrick Wilde's 1994 play What's Wrong With Angry?.

Wisdom's films include his role as Ryan in Hey Mr DJ (2003), Astinos in 300 (2007), and as 'Midnight' Mark in the 2009 film The Boat That Rocked. Other film roles were in The Sisterhood of the Traveling Pants 2 (2008), The Lightkeepers (2010), Romeo and Juliet (2013), and as Douglas Talbot in Soulmate (2013).

Filmography

References

External links

1973 births
Alumni of the Academy Drama School
English male film actors
English male television actors
Living people
People from Swindon